Andy or Andrew Lloyd may refer to:

Andy Lloyd (cricketer) (born 1956), English cricketer for Warwickshire
Andy Lloyd (rugby union) (born 1981), Welsh international rugby union player
Andrew Lloyd (athlete) (born 1959), English-born Australian runner and 1990 Commonwealth Champion
Andrew Lloyd (tennis), American tennis player in 1960s
Andrew Lloyd (MP), Member for Shropshire (UK Parliament constituency) in 1658-59

See also
Andrew Lloyd Webber (born 1948), British composer and impresario